Henry Dunn may refer to:

Henry Treffry Dunn (1838–1899), Dante Gabriel Rossetti's assistant and painter in his own right
Henry Dunn (educationalist) (1801–1878), English educationalist and author
Henry Dunn (conspirator), involved in the Babington Plot
Henry Dunn (Harper's Island), a character in TV series Harper's Island

See also
Henry Dunne (1872–1959), Australian rules footballer 
Harry Dunn (disambiguation)